Presidential elections were held in the South African Republic (ZAR) between 3 January and 4 February 1898. The result was a victory for incumbent Paul Kruger.

Background
The incumbent president Paul Kruger was involved in a constitutional battle with Chief Justice John Gilbert Kotzé. After trying to unsuccessfully remove Kotzé though legislation, he waited until after the election to dismiss him.

Candidates
Kruger ran for re-election alongside two challengers.

A distinguished member of the Volksraad and commandant of the Lydenburg Commando, Schalk Willem Burger was popular with the British and the capitalists of Johannesburg. This was due to the South African Industrial Report of 1897, produced by a committee under his leadership, which called for the lowering of tariffs, among other suggestions. Despite the conclusions of the report, Burger was an ardent patriot; however, the conclusions of the report and support from anti-ZAR newspapers led some voters to distrust him.

Vice-President and Commandant-General Piet Joubert had previously run against Kruger three times without success. He had narrowly lost against him in 1893, losing by around 900 votes, with allegations of electoral manipulation in favour of Kruger and reports of voter turnout being greater than 100%.

Claims were made that former Cape Colony Prime Minister Cecil Rhodes colluded against Kruger during the election campaign.

Results

Aftermath
After his re-election Kruger removed Kotzé from office.

References

Elections in Transvaal
1898 elections in Africa
1898 in the South African Republic
1890s in Transvaal